Hits and Highways Ahead is the first compilation album by American country music artist Lee Roy Parnell. It was released in 1999 by the Arista Nashville label. It peaked at #63 on the Top Country Albums chart.

Track listing

Personnel

 Eddie Bayers - drums
 Richard Bennett - electric guitar
 Dan Dugmore - steel guitar
 The Fairfield Four - background vocals
 Davey Faragher - bass guitar
 Chris Harris - background vocals
 Teresa James - background vocals
 John Barlow Jarvis - piano
 John Jorgenson - electric guitar
 Jim Keltner - drums
 Kevin McKendree - piano
 Terry McMillan - percussion
 Steve Mackey - bass guitar
 Jonell Mosser - background vocals
 Lee Roy Parnell - electric guitar, slide guitar, lead vocals
 James Pennebaker - acoustic guitar, electric guitar
 Don Potter - acoustic guitar
 Michael Rhodes - bass guitar
 Joseph Rice - background vocals
 Matt Rollings - keyboards
 Russell Smith - background vocals
 Michael Spriggs - acoustic guitar
 Harry Stinson - background vocals
 Fred Tackett - acoustic guitar, electric guitar
 Scott Thurston - background vocals
 Jeffrey "C.J." Vanston - organ
 Billy Joe Walker Jr. - acoustic guitar
 Lynn Williams - drums
 Dennis Wilson - background vocals
 Glenn Worf - bass guitar
 Bob Wray - bass guitar
 Reese Wynans - organ
 Trisha Yearwood - background vocals
 Curtis Young - background vocals

Chart performance

References
Hits and Highways Ahead at CMT.com

Lee Roy Parnell albums
1999 compilation albums
Albums produced by Barry Beckett
Albums produced by Scott Hendricks
Arista Records compilation albums